Muhammad Parvesh Shaheen (also spelled Mohammad Perwesh Shaheen) is a Pakistani historian and author from Manglawar, Swat. Muhammad Parvesh Shaheen has preserved Library of about 30,000 Books including Journals and Digests etc. He is the author of more than 45 books in Language Pashto, Urdu and English.

Early life 
Muhammad Parvesh Shaheen was born in a village named Manglawar, which is 8 km East to main City Mingora of Swat . Shaheen was born on Oct 12, 1944. He got his early education from Primary School Manglawar. Parvesh Shaheen belongs to a middle family. He was serving as Principal Govt; Higher Secondary School Peshawar on Grade 19, now retired.

Academic Qualification 
 M.A Pashto, University of Peshawar
 M.A History, University of Punjab
 M.A Urdu, University of Peshawar
 M.A Education, University of Punjab
 Graduation Certificate in Sociology, AIOU Islamabad
Parvesh Shaheen is a Gold Medalist from University of Peshawar.

Services

As Writer 
Parvesh Shaheen started writing for "Daily Shahbaz Peshawar" in 1958, when he was in 7th standard.
Papers for Newspapers, Magazines and Journals, He writes more than 1000 articles. Published more than 500 columns in Newspapers, and also published more than 50 for journals. Writes essays for all leading journals of Pakistan particularly Universities research journals & other National Standard journals since 1980.

Books 
Muhammad Parvesh Shaheen wrote more than 45 books, some of stated under:

Pashto Books

Urdu Books

As Educationist 
Parvesh Shaheen worked with Japan Province Project (1998-2000) as Chairman. Kalam Development Project of Switzerland as Culture Consultant. 'Servier Allai Dam Hydel Project Batagram' as Servier.
Parvesh Shaheen also worked as Research Scholar for 'Ancient Wooden Museum Preservation Lok-Versa Islamabad', and Literary & Culture Adviser to Commissioner Malakand Division since 1985.

As Linguist 
 Muhammad Parvesh Shaheen a member of New Alphabet Committee Pashto Academy Peshawar.
 Worked as a Review Expert of Pashto Computerized Alphabet Committee Islamabad, 2005. 
 Also worked as a 'Director of National Language Authority' Govt. of Khyberpakhtunkhwa. 
 Also worked on Kalasha language.

Other Activities

Literary Forum 
Muhammad Parvesh Shaheen is President of Swat Adabi Jarga.

Speaker 
Extempore Orator and speaker in Seminars throughout the country.

Interviews 
Muhammad Parvesh Shaheen have had interviews with National and International TV Channels and Radios.

Survivor & Culture Preservation 
 Taliban:
During the Swat Operations Muhammad Parvesh Shaheen opposed Taliban, being a prominent figure beaten, injured and damage caused to personal library by Taliban.

 Culture Preservation:
Buried personal archaeological remains in earth during the insurgency period for the preservation & latter on worked as volunteer with Italian Mission in the reconstruction of damage caused to the world known statue of Buddha.

Research Fields 
 Pashto Language and Literature
 Urdu Language & Liteture
 Gandhara Culture
 Buddhism
 Journalism
 Ecology & Environment
 Tourism
 Folk Lore
 Ancient History
 Language
 Children Literature

Library 
Personal Library consist of more than 25 thousand books.
Video Cassette more than 40.
Audio Cassette more than 50.
CDs more than 20.
Personal Museum Hall.

Comments

Comments on Life & Works 
Published By:
 Pashto Academy Peshawar University
 Jalal Abad University, Afghanistan
 Sindhology Sindh University, Hyderabad
 Pakistan Writers Forum.
 M.A Thesis done by student Ali Rahman Pakistan study Center Peshawar University.

Comments of Poet and Writers 
Published in different Newspapers, Magazines & Journals by many poets & writers in shape of articles etc.

Books Included in Courses 
 Two books by AIOU Islamabad
 CSS Course

Guidance

Guidance to Students 
Muhammad Parvesh Shaheen provides guidance to students and Scholars from all over the world. People came and seek for help. Most of the students came for:
  MA (Thesis) 
  M.Phil (Thesis)
  Ph.D (Thesis)

Iqbaliat 
Every student who works on the topic Iqbal and Pakhtoons is referred by Iqbal Academy for contact.

Appreciation Letters 
His Highness Dalai Lama the Great.

See also 
 Manglawar
 Buddhist Rock Carvings in Manglawar
 Miangul Abdul Haq Jahanzeb Kidney Hospital
 Tehsil Babuzai
 Swat District

References

External links 
 Da Swat Guloona By Parvesh Shaheen PDF, Kitaboona, Retrieved: April 4, 2015
 Wadi Chitral By Parvesh Shaheen PDF, Kitaboona, Retrieved: April 4, 2015

Manglawar
People from Swat District
1944 births
Living people